Ben Davies (born 21 April 2000) is an English professional rugby league footballer who plays as a  or  for St Helens.

Background
Davies was born in Widnes, Cheshire, England.

He played for Halton Farnworth Hornets and then switched to Widnes Moorfield. He also represented Lancashire Academy and part of the England U18's squad. He then joined the Widnes Vikings Academy.

Career
He made his professional début for Widnes in the Championship in 2019.

Davies made his first team début for St Helens as a  against the Salford Red Devils on 26 Oct 2020. Due to end-of-season fixture congestion caused by the COVID-19 pandemic, Saints fielded a very young side, resting the majority of first team players, in preparation of their derby match against the Wigan Warriors four days later.  In round 23 of the 2022 Super League season, Davies scored two tries in St Helens 60-6 victory over Hull F.C.

Salford Red Devils (loan)
On 8 June 2021 it was reported that he had signed for Salford in the Super League on loan.

References

External links
St Helens profile

2000 births
Living people
English rugby league players
Rugby league centres
Rugby league players from Widnes
Rugby league wingers
Salford Red Devils players
St Helens R.F.C. players
Widnes Vikings players